Daniel Herrington (born July 12, 1986) is an American racing driver from Baltimore, Maryland.

Herrington began his professional racing career in Formula BMW USA in 2004 with a partial schedule. He competed full-time in 2005 for Jensen Motorsport and finished 12th in points. In 2006 he moved to the Star Mazda Series and finished 10th in points with one victory. In 2007 he made his Firestone Indy Lights Series (then called the Indy Pro Series) debut for SpeedWorks, competing in 5 road course races and placing 23rd in points. He drove another partial season in 2008, competing in 8 races for Michael Crawford Motorsports and finishing 20th in points. In 2009 he will compete full-time for the new Bryan Herta Autosport team. Daniel captured his first FILS victory at the Chicagoland 100 and finished 7th in points. Herrington returned to the series for the penultimate race of 2010 at Kentucky, stepping into BHA's No. 29 car when Sebastián Saavedra quit mid-race weekend. He competed in the following race for Genoa Racing. In 2011 he competed in the Sam Schmidt Motorsports #77 car in Toronto while both the car's regular drivers, Conor Daly and Bryan Clauson, were unavailable due to other commitments. He also drove the car in the double-header in Edmonton.

He currently resides in Raleigh, North Carolina.

Racing record

American open–wheel racing results
(key)

Star Mazda Championship

Indy Lights

References

External links
Daniel Herrington's official website
IndyCar.com bio

1986 births
Living people
Indy Lights drivers
Sportspeople from Baltimore
Racing drivers from Baltimore
Formula BMW USA drivers
Indy Pro 2000 Championship drivers
24 Hours of Daytona drivers
Sportspeople from Raleigh, North Carolina
Racing drivers from Maryland

Arrow McLaren SP drivers
Rahal Letterman Lanigan Racing drivers
Bryan Herta Autosport drivers